Luteinizing hormone subunit beta also known as lutropin subunit beta or LHβ is a polypeptide that in association with an alpha subunit common to all gonadotropin hormones forms the reproductive signaling molecule luteinizing hormone.  In humans it is encoded by the LHB gene.

Gene 

The luteinizing hormone beta subunit is encoded by a single gene in all mammals.  In primates, this gene is located within a cluster that arose through gene duplication, and also includes multiple redundant genes encoding the beta subunit of chorionic gonadotropin as well as several nonfunctional pseudogenes.  In humans these are contiguous on chromosome 19q13.3. In equids the beta subunit polypeptides of luteinizing hormone and chorionic gonadotropin are identical in sequence, differing only in their carbohydrate side-chains, and are the product of a single gene.

Function 

This gene is a member of the glycoprotein hormone beta chain family and encodes the beta subunit of luteinizing hormone (LH). Glycoprotein hormones are heterodimers consisting of a common alpha subunit and a unique beta subunit (this protein) which confers biological specificity. LH is expressed in the pituitary gland and promotes spermatogenesis and ovulation by stimulating the testes and ovaries to synthesize steroids.

Clinical significance 

Mutations in this gene are associated with hypogonadism which is characterized by infertility and pseudohermaphroditism.

References

Further reading